Zaring is a surname. Notable people with the surname include:

Bill Zaring (1917–2003), American racecar driver
Grace Stone (née Zaring, 1891–1991), American novelist and short story writer
Louise Zaring (1872–1970), American painter